Krystian Klecha (born 30 September 1984 in Kościan, Poland) is a Polish speedway rider and a former Team U-21 World Champion. He has been riding since 2001.

Career
 Individual Under-21 World Championship
 2005 - 10th place (3 points)
 Team Under-21 World Championship
 2005 - World Champion (3 points)
 Team Polish Championship
 2004 - 5th place with Polonia Bydgoszcz
 2005 - Silver medal with Polonia Bydgoszcz
 2006 - Bronze medal with Polonia Bydgoszcz
 2007 - 8th place with Polonia Bydgoszcz
 Team Under-21 Polish Championship
 2004 - 5th place
 2005 - 4th place

See also 
Poland national speedway team

External links
(pl) Official Site

Polish speedway riders
1984 births
Living people
Team Speedway Junior World Champions
Polonia Bydgoszcz riders